The First Lok Sabha was constituted on 17 April 1952 after India's first general election. The 1st Lok Sabha lasted its full tenure of five years and was dissolved on 4 April 1957. The First Session of this Lok Sabha commenced on 13 May 1952.

Total Lok Sabha seats were 489 and total eligible voters were 17.3 crores. The Indian National Congress (INC) won 364 seats. They were followed by Independents, winning a total of 37 seats. The Communist Party of India (CPI) and the Socialist Party (India) followed with 16 and 12 seats respectively. Indian National Congress got 45% of the total votes in this election and won 76% of the 479 contested seats.

Lok Sabha officers 
As per Article 93 of Constitution of India, the Lok Sabha must have elected and non-elected officers. The elected members are Speaker and the Deputy Speaker whereas the non-elected members are the Secretariat staff. Following were the 1st Lok Sabha officers and other important members.

a. (Not Officially Declared) The position of Leader of the Opposition only got recognition in 1977 post Salary and Allowances of Leaders of Opposition in Parliament Act.

Members 

List of members as published by the Election Commission of India and Parliament of India:

Members by political party in 1st Lok Sabha are given below:

List of first Women members is as below:

( Please add this information)

Loksabha Seats by States and Union Territories

Assam

Bihar

Bombay

Madhya Pradesh

Madras State

Orissa

Punjab

Uttar Pradesh

West Bengal

Hyderabad State

Madhya Bharat

Mysore State

Patiala and East Punjab States Union

Rajasthan

Saurashtra

Travancore Cochin

Ajmer State

Bhopal State

Bilaspur State

Coorg State

Delhi

Himachal Pradesh

Kutch State

Manipur

Tripura

Vindhya Pradesh

Anglo-Indian (Nominated)

See also 
 List of members of the 1st Lok Sabha
 Parliament of India

References 

Terms of the Lok Sabha
India MPs 1952–1957
1952 establishments in India
1957 disestablishments in India